"L'eccezione" is a 2002 song by Italian singer-songwriter Carmen Consoli and the title track and lead single of the album with the same name.

The song peaked at number 4 of the FIMI singles chart.

Personnel
Credits adapted from Tidal.
 Carmen Consoli – producer, author, associated performer, recording arranger, vocals
 Francesco Barbaro – producer
 Massimo Roccaforte – producer, associated performer, recording arranger
 Maurizio Nicotra – producer, associated performer, recording arranger
 Leandro Misuriello – associated performer, recording arranger
 Puccio Panettieri – associated performer, recording arranger
 Santi Pulvirenti – associated performer, recording arranger

Track listing

Charts

References

2002 songs
2002 singles